Final Destination: Red Lantern is a 1960 West German crime film directed by Rudolf Jugert and starring Joachim Fuchsberger, Christine Görner and Klausjürgen Wussow.

It is the third film version of Norbert Jacques' novel Plüsch und Plümowski, after The Bordello in Rio (1927) and Blondes for Export (1950).

Cast
 Joachim Fuchsberger as Martin Stelling
 Christine Görner as Verena Linkmann
 Klausjürgen Wussow as Jan Fabrizius
  as Irene van Laan
 Werner Peters as Van laan
 Nana Osten as Uschi Berger
 Wolfgang Büttner
 Gudrun Schmidt as Nana Noel
 Otto Storr
 Annemarie Holtz
 Ernst Konstantin
 Elinor von Wallerstein
 Paul Bös
 Dorothee Parker
 Ernst G. Schiffner
 Micaela Wackermann
 Herbert Weicker
 Anja Brüning as Inga
 Eva Schauland

References

Bibliography
 Bergfelder, Tim. International Adventures: German Popular Cinema and European Co-Productions in the 1960s. Berghahn Books, 2005.

External links 
 

1960 films
1960 crime films
German crime films
West German films
1960s German-language films
Films directed by Rudolf Jugert
Films about prostitution in the Netherlands
Films set in Amsterdam
Films set in Havana
Remakes of German films
UFA GmbH films
1960s German films